The men's parallel giant slalom competition in snowboarding at the 2022 Winter Olympics was held on 8 February, at the Genting Snow Park in Zhangjiakou. The event was won by Benjamin Karl of Austria, the 2010 silver and 2014 bronze medalist. Tim Mastnak of Slovenia won silver, his first Olympic medal. Vic Wild, the 2014 champion, representing the Russian Olympic Committee, won the bronze medal.

Nevin Galmarini was the defending champion. He did not qualify for the elimination round. The 2018 silver medalist, Lee Sang-ho, and the bronze medalist, Žan Košir, qualified for the Olympics as well. At the 2021–22 FIS Snowboard World Cup, five parallel giant slalom events were held before the Olympics. Stefan Baumeister was leading the ranking, followed by Lee and Dmitry Loginov. Loginov was the 2021 world champion, with Roland Fischnaller and Andrey Sobolev being the silver and bronze medalists, respectively.

Qualification

A total of 32 snowboarders qualified to compete at the games. For an athlete to compete they must have a minimum of 100.00 FIS points on the FIS Points List on January 17, 2022 and a top 30 finish in a World Cup event or at the FIS Snowboard World Championships 2021. A country could enter a maximum of four athletes into the event.

Results

Qualification run
The qualification was started at 11:07.

Elimination round

References

Men's snowboarding at the 2022 Winter Olympics